Edward Ato Sarpong (born March 29, 1969) is a business executive, chartered accountant, business and leadership consultant, executive coach, speaker, author, and a  politician of Ghanaian descent. He was the Deputy Minister for Communications during the John Mahama administration.

References

Ghanaian politicians
1969 births
Living people